Bang the Drum Slowly is a 1973 American sports drama film directed by John D. Hancock, about a baseball player of limited intellect who has a terminal illness, and his brainier, more skilled teammate. It is a film adaptation of the 1956 baseball novel of the same name by American author Mark Harris. It was previously dramatized in 1956 on the U.S. Steel Hour with Paul Newman, Albert Salmi and George Peppard.

This version stars Michael Moriarty and a then little known Robert De Niro as baseball teammates. De Niro's performance in this film and in Mean Streets, released two months later, brought him widespread acclaim.

Plot
Henry Wiggen (Moriarty) is a star pitcher for the New York Mammoths, a fictional Major League Baseball team. He is a valuable player to his manager Dutch but is in a dispute with the team's ownership, holding out for a new contract and more money. Henry has a sideline as an insurance salesman working for the Arcturus Corporation, with ballplayers as his clients. Henry's friend Bruce Pearson (De Niro), the team's catcher, is a player of limited skill and intellect. Teammates call Henry by the nickname "Author" because the brainy pitcher once wrote a book, although Bruce misunderstands and, with his thick Southern drawl, often calls him "Arthur" instead.

Henry and Bruce leave the Mayo Clinic in Minnesota, where Bruce has been told he is terminally ill with Hodgkin's disease. They drive to Bruce's hometown in Georgia, because Bruce always wanted his only friend to see it. On their first night there, Bruce burns his old baseball memorabilia to acknowledge the inevitable end of his life.

The team knows nothing about Bruce's fate. At spring training, Dutch is preparing to release Bruce in favor of a hot young prospect, country boy Piney Woods. So management is amazed and confused when Henry ends his holdout and agrees to a new contract on one condition: that he and Bruce come as a package. If one is on the team, so is the other. If one is traded or sent down to the minor leagues, the other goes, too.

Dutch tries everything to make Henry reveal why he insists that Bruce catch for him. In the meantime, the Mammoths are losing games and have a low morale, with teammates quarreling among themselves. Knowing that he is dying, Bruce wants Henry to change the beneficiary on his life insurance policy from his parents to his girlfriend Katie. Henry knows she is interested only in Bruce's money and is taking advantage of his circumstances, so Henry only pretends to change it.

One day when a player teases Bruce, a frustrated Henry blurts out the fact that Bruce is dying. He asks that it remain confidential, but quickly teammates and Dutch all learn the news. They begin to treat Bruce differently and each other as well, and the team's play and mood both improve. Near the end of the season, Bruce becomes too ill to continue playing. The team eventually wins the World Series, but Bruce returns home to spend his final days with his parents. As they part ways at the airport, Bruce asks Henry to send him a scorecard from the Series, which Henry laments he never did. After the season is over, Bruce dies, and Henry is the only member of the team to attend his funeral, serving as pallbearer. While visiting Bruce's grave, Henry vows, "From here on in, I rag nobody."

Cast
 Robert De Niro as Bruce Pearson
 Michael Moriarty as Henry Wiggen
 Vincent Gardenia as Dutch Schnell
 Phil Foster as Joe
 Heather MacRae as Holly
 Ann Wedgeworth as Katie
 Tom Ligon as Piney Woods
 Danny Aiello as Horse
 Selma Diamond as Tootsie
 Barbara Babcock as Team Owner
 Patrick McVey as Bruce's Father
 Marshall Efron as Bradley

Production
The non-Florida baseball sequences were filmed at New York City's Yankee and Shea Stadiums during late May and June 1972, when the Yankees and Mets were on extended road-trips. The tarpaulin-covered field and scoreboard of Robert F. Kennedy Stadium  ("RFK Stadium", originally D.C. Stadium),  where the American League's Washington Senators (1961-71) played until moving to Texas as the Rangers the year of filming), is also seen during the rain-delay scene.   The opening scenes of the movie show the stars running on the warning track at Yankee Stadium; in addition, the visitors' clubhouse, the walkway from the Yankees' dugout, and the front of the right-field bullpen also were used in the "away game" sequences. The few scenes of Yankee Stadium – particularly the wide pan at the end of the rain delay sequence – are some of the best clips of the stadium before the 1974–1975 renovation. Dugout shots of "home" games were shot at Yankee Stadium.

The "home" game sequences were filmed in Shea Stadium. The filmmakers also used the walkway that connected the Mets clubhouse, dugout, and the TV studio that was the home of Kiner's Korner post-game show for the singing scene. The Opening Day/band clips came from Major League Baseball (MLB); they were recorded before the fourth game of the 1969 World Series at Shea. Wide crowd shots are from a regular season game, and MLB films also provided clips of Tony Pérez (from the 1970 World Series) and Brooks Robinson hitting.

Spring-training baseball scenes were shot at the Philadelphia Phillies' complex in Clearwater, Florida, which is still in use. Rain-delay footage of a grounds crew covering the infield with a tarp was from the 1969 All-Star Game in Washington's RFK Stadium (the game was postponed by rain and played the next day). In the audio over this clip was the voice of long-time Yankees' public-address announcer Bob Sheppard. Baseball-game action clips starting at 01:21 are from MLB films; they are from Yankees and Mets games in 1970 and 1971 – Danny Cater (10), shortstop Gene Michael (17), hitter Jerry Kenney, catcher Thurman Munson (15), and runner Bobby Murcer (1) can be seen.

The uniforms worn by the Mammoths baseball team are Yankees uniforms from 1971, but the "NY" on the home pinstriped shirts was changed. Other teams providing uniforms were the Pittsburgh Pirates and the Boston Red Sox.

The film and book include a fictional card game known as tegwar, an acronym for "the exciting game without any rules". It is a game designed to separate a sucker from their cash. Henry Wiggen plays this game along with other ballplayers and coaches to sucker passers-by in the lobby of the team hotel. It is generally believed that Bruce Pearson is too dumb to be able to sucker people, so he is initially excluded; however, Henry begins to include Bruce in the tegwar games as the story progresses.

This film is reportedly Robert De Niro's colleague Al Pacino's favorite film. In reviews, Wiggen is often referred to as being modeled after Tom Seaver, though not in the book, which was written when Seaver was 12.

One piece of artistic license: Moriarity's Wiggen is a right-handed pitcher, while Wiggen in Harris's novels is explicitly a left-handed pitcher; in fact, the Harris book that featured Wiggen and that preceded Bang the Drum Slowly (1956) was titled The Southpaw (1953).

One error was the scoreboard at the end of the game against the Pirates only shows 8 innings played.

Reception
Roger Ebert of the Chicago Sun-Times gave the film his top grade of four stars and wrote that "it's not so much a sports movie as a movie about those elusive subjects, male bonding and work in America. That the males play baseball and that sport is their work is what makes this the ultimate baseball movie; never before has a movie considered the game from the inside out." Roger Greenspun of The New York Times wrote, "Except for some updating, and minimal plot simplification, John Hancock's 'Bang the Drum Slowly' is a remarkably faithful rendering of the well-known baseball novel that Mark Harris wrote in 1955. It is one of those rare instances in which close adaptation of a good book has resulted in possibly an even better movie." Arthur D. Murphy of Variety said, "John Hancock's second feature directorial effort is very good in sustaining credible melodrama in the story of a dying baseball player and his pal. The film has nothing trendy going for it before the fact, either in the artistic or commercial sense, but it emerges as a touching, amusing and heart-warming picture." Gene Siskel of the Chicago Tribune gave the film three stars out of four and stated that it "does offer considerable entertainment, will provide at least a few sniffles, and does have a human center. The reason: The movie is very funny. Its best moments are not the maudlin, heart-tugging passages of dialog laced with mournful piano, but the locker-room antics of the baseball team itself." Kevin Thomas of the Los Angeles Times called the film "deeply affecting, often humorous but never morbid or maudlin," and "a film studded with terrific scenes and telling bits of dialog, reminding us anew of how valuable the contribution of even the most unprepossessing individual can be." Conversely, Gary Arnold of The Washington Post declared that "I found it a disappointing picture, flat and banal and not nearly as effective as the television movie 'Brian's Song,' with which 'Bang the Drum Slowly' is bound to be compared."

, Bang the Drum Slowly holds a rating of 92% on Rotten Tomatoes based on 38 reviews.

Awards and honors
For his portrayal of Dutch Schnell, Vincent Gardenia received an Academy Award for Best Supporting Actor nomination.
 Timeout magazine named it 12th best baseball movie of all time.

The film is recognized by American Film Institute in these lists:
 2006: AFI's 100 Years...100 Cheers – Nominated
 2008: AFI's 10 Top 10:	
 Nominated Sports Film

See also

 List of American films of 1973

References

External links
 
 
 
 

1973 films
1970s sports drama films
American baseball films
American sports drama films
1970s English-language films
Films directed by John D. Hancock
Films set in New York City
Paramount Pictures films
1973 drama films
1970s American films
Films about disability